Serebryanka is a rural locality (a selo) in Kostyukovsky Selsoviet of Svobodnensky District, Amur Oblast, Russia. The population was 237 as of 2018. There are 3 streets.

Geography 
Serebryanka is located 32 km west of Svobodny (the district's administrative centre) by road. Kostyukovka is the nearest rural locality.

References 

Rural localities in Svobodnensky District